JDS Mochizuki (DD-166) was the third ship of Takatsuki-class destroyerss. She was commissioned on 25 March 1969.

Construction and career
Mochizuki was laid down on November 22, 1966 at Ishikawajima Harima Heavy Industries Tokyo No. 2 Factory as the 2306th ship, a 3,000-ton type A II guard ship planned for 1965 based on the Second Defense Build-up Plan, and 1968. Launched on March 15, 1969, commissioned on March 25, 1969, it was incorporated into the Second Defense Build-up Group as a ship under direct control and deployed to Sasebo.

The standard displacement at the time of new construction from this ship is 3,100 tons, the main engine is Kawasaki impulsive type, and the can is Kawasaki BD120-1 type. This ship is the only Kawasaki main engine of the same type.

On February 1, 1971, he was transferred to the 1st Escort Corps of the 2nd Escort Corps, and the homeport was transferred to Kure.

Participated in practicing ocean voyages in 1972 and 1979.

It was dispatched as a disaster in response to the 10th Yuyomaru incident that occurred in Tokyo Bay on November 9, 1974, and was disposed of along with the escort vessels JS Haruna, JDS Takatsuki, and JDS Yukikaze on November 26. He was dispatched to the scene and fired for submergence from the 27th to the 28th.

From May 12 to June 27, 1977, participated in Hawaii dispatch training with the escort ship JDS Kikuzuki, JDS Makishio and eight P-2J aircraft.

From November 1 to December 17, 1980, participated in Hawaii dispatch training with the escort vessels JDS Tachikaze, JDS Kikuzuki and eight P-2Js.

On March 30, 1983, it became a ship under the direct control of the 3rd Escort Group, and the fixed port was transferred to Maizuru.

On March 30, 1984, the 2nd Escort Corps was newly formed under the 3rd Escort Corps group and incorporated with JDS Nagatsuki.

On January 25, 1989, the 2nd Escort Corps was reorganized under the Maizuru District Force.

Since June 1994, she has participated in a practicing voyage to North America with the escort vessels JDS Nagatsuki, JDS Takatsuki, and JS Shirayuki.

On March 16, 1995, it was transferred to the Maizuru District Force as a ship under direct control. On April 1, the same year, the type was changed to a special service ship, the ship registration number was changed to (ASU-7019), and the fixed port became Sasebo again.

Decommissioned on March 19, 1999. The total itinerary reached 706,382.6 nautical miles (32.7 laps of the earth).

Citations

References 

 石橋孝夫『海上自衛隊全艦船 1952-2002』（並木書房、2002年）
 『世界の艦船 増刊第66集 海上自衛隊全艦艇史』（海人社、2004年）
 『世界の艦船 第750集』海人社、2011年11月号

1968 ships
Takatsuki-class destroyers
Ships built by IHI Corporation